NGC 5002 is a Magellanic spiral galaxy in Canes Venatici. It was discovered by Heinrich d'Arrest in 1865. It is also known as MCG 6-29-51, PGC 45728, UGC 8254.

It has an apparent size of 1.7 by 1.0 arcmin.

References

External links 
 

5002
08254
045728
Canes Venatici
Barred spiral galaxies